John T. Hendrickson is an American businessman, the chairman, president and chief executive officer (CEO) of Perrigo, since April 2016, when he succeeded Joseph C. Papa, who became the chairman and CEO of Valeant Pharmaceuticals.

Hendrickson received bachelor's degrees in Chemistry from Hope College, and in Chemical Engineering from the University of Michigan, and an MBA from the University of Notre Dame.

References

Year of birth missing (living people)
Living people
Hope College alumni
University of Michigan College of Engineering alumni
University of Notre Dame alumni
American chief executives